Miguel Antonio Segura Vargas (born 2 September 1963) is a Costa Rican retired football goalkeeper.

Club career
He started his career in 1983 at Sagrada Familia, had a spell at Ramonense and moved to Saprissa in 1987. He ended up playing 83 games for Saprissa. He also played for Palmares, Turrialba, Limonense and abroad for Salvadoran sides Municipal Limeño and Dragón and Guatemalan outfit Deportivo Carchá.

When with Saprissa, Segura set a new Costa Rican Primera Division record of keeping a clean sheet of 855 minutes during 10 matches in 1989. Until 2012, he also held the Centroamerican record but was surpassed by Guatemalan goalkeeper Ricardo Jerez.

International career
Nicknamed Manguera, Segura was a non-playing squad member for Costa Rica in the 1990 FIFA World Cup.

Retirement
After retiring as a player, Segura worked in the minor leagues as a coach. He also worked as a goalkeeper coach, for Cartaginés and Uruguay de Coronado among others. In 2014, he was goalkeeper coach at Belén FC.

Personal life
He is married to Kattia María Mora Soto and has one daughter, Jessica.

References

External links
FIFA profile

1963 births
Living people
People from San José Province
Association football goalkeepers
Costa Rican footballers
Costa Rica international footballers
1990 FIFA World Cup players
A.D. Ramonense players
Deportivo Saprissa players
Costa Rican expatriate footballers
Expatriate footballers in El Salvador
Expatriate footballers in Guatemala
Costa Rican expatriate sportspeople in El Salvador
Costa Rican expatriate sportspeople in Guatemala